The Norwegian Academy of Technological Sciences (NTVA) is a learned society based in Trondheim, Norway.

Founded in 1955, the academy has about 500 members. It is a member of the International Council of Academies of Engineering and Technological Sciences (CAETS) and of the European Council of Applied Sciences and Engineering (Euro-CASE).

References

External links
Official site

1955 establishments in Norway
National academies of engineering
 
Organisations based in Trondheim
Scientific organizations established in 1955
Learned societies of Norway